Alberto Obarrio (born 3 March 1944) is an Argentine sailor. He competed in the Finn event at the 1968 Summer Olympics.

References

External links
 
 

1944 births
Living people
Argentine male sailors (sport)
Olympic sailors of Argentina
Sailors at the 1968 Summer Olympics – Finn
Sportspeople from Buenos Aires